Thøger Nordbø (29 October 1904 – 1 May 1994) was a Norwegian footballer. He played in five matches for the Norway national football team from 1928 to 1935.

References

External links
 

1904 births
1994 deaths
Norwegian footballers
Norway international footballers
Place of birth missing
Association footballers not categorized by position